Kero One is a Korean-American hip hop MC, producer, and DJ from San Francisco, California. He has been recognized for re-introducing the jazz rap sound in the early to mid 2000s with his jazz-hop album Windmills of the Soul.

History
Kero One originally worked as a web designer, making 50 copies of his first single with home equipment and personal credit cards. He released his first 12" record, Check the Blueprints in 2003 on his own imprint, Plug Label. Of the 50 copies that were eventually distributed around the world, one reached a tiny record store in Tokyo, Japan. A few weeks later, it was found by a Japanese DJ who played it at a club that night and received dozens of inquiries, including a Japanese label executive who immediately contacted Kero One and asked for 3,000 copies of the record.

In 2012, Kero one released his fourth solo album, Color Theory, which raised over $10k from fans to pay for the mastering and engineering costs through Kickstarter. His lead single "What Am I Supposed to Do" charted on Radio Nova (France), J*Wave Japan, and WDR Funkhaus europa radio in Germany. The song received a major endorsement from Stevie Wonder, who asked Kero One to perform it at Wonder's 17th Annual House Full of Toys Benefit Concert on December 15, 2012 at Nokia Live Theatre with Bruno Mars.

Later, Kero One formed a new collaboration project, Kesna Music with YouTube singer Esna Yoon. They released their single "Is It Love?" on July 16, 2013.<ref>a-Tunes.net. (2013-04-23) “Kero One & Esna Form Kesna Music” 'a-Tunes.net. Accessed 2013-07-17.</ref>

In 2015, Kero One brought his signature jazz-hop sound to Korea, producing a song called "Ordinary Love" for Korean rapper Park Kyung of Block B and Park Bo-Ram, which hit #1 on Melon charts.  Later that year, Kero One released a future soul album under the alias "Kero Uno", called Reflection (noitcelfer) Eternal'' which made it to Reddit's ListenToThis best of 2015 albums list. Also in 2016, South Korean longboarder Hyo Joo Ko used Kero One's 2012 song "So Seductive" in one of her Instagram videos. When Kero One reposted the video on his Facebook page it went viral, reaching 26 million views. The viral video brought Hyo Joo Ko international fame and renewed interest in Kero One's older song.

Highlights
 5th Best Indie hiphop of 2004 on MSN music
 4th Most Downloaded artist on Cnet's Download.com
 2nd selling underground hiphop album on HMV and Tower Records Japan
 2nd most downloaded album on iTunes Japan
 Landed on Reddit's ListenToThis best of 2015 albums list

Discography

Albums

Singles

Collaborative works

References

External links

KERO ONE - BIOGRAPHY
Reviews of Windmills of the Soul
Windmills of the Soul : rapnews.co.uk
Windmills of the Soul : RapReviews.com
Kinetic World : Lesson Six
DJ Deckstream - Soundtrack 1.5
Nomak Re-Calm
 Allhiphop.com review (February 26, 2006)
 Platform8470 interview April 12, 2009

American musicians of Korean descent
American rappers of Asian descent
Musicians from the San Francisco Bay Area
Hip hop record producers
Musical groups established in 2003
Living people
Rappers from the San Francisco Bay Area
21st-century American rappers
Year of birth missing (living people)